The red-and-white crake (Laterallus leucopyrrhus) is a species of bird in subfamily Rallinae of family Rallidae, the rails, gallinules, and coots. It is found in Argentina, Brazil, Paraguay, and Uruguay.

Taxonomy and systematics

The red-and-white crake is monotypic.

Description

The sexes are alike. Their head, neck and back are bright chestnut with a sharp demarcation from their white throat and breast. The rest of their upperparts are dark olive brown, and their  are barred black and white. Their unique undertail coverts as a whole have a black center and white edges.

Distribution and habitat

The red-and-white crake is found in southeastern Brazil from Río de Janeiro state south through eastern Paraguay and much of Uruguay into northeastern Argentina as far as northern Buenos Aires Province. It inhabits a variety of wet landscapes that generally have shallow water to moist soil, tall or matted grasses or reeds, and often shrubs, thickets, and scattered small trees.

Behavior

Movement

The red-and-white crake appears to be a year-round resident throughout its range.

Feeding

The red-and-white crake usually forages by itself, walking on the ground or climbing among vegetation. Its diet is mostly small invertebrates such as insects and worms, and also includes seeds.

Breeding

The red-and-white crake's breeding season in Argentina appears to span from October to February but is not known elsewhere. It has a side entrance. The typical clutch size is three eggs. In captivity the incubation period is about 24 days and young are independent in about four weeks.

Vocalization

The red-and-white crake's song is "a prolonged throaty chatter; also described as a resonant trill", sometimes given in duet. An alarm call is "a low cui whistle" and a call believed to be aggressive is a "harsh chrrrrrr...".

Status

The IUCN has assessed the red-and-white crake as being of Least Concern. It has a fairly large range, but its population size and trend are not known. No immediate threats have been identified. However, "habitat destruction by urban growth, land filling and livestock grazing" have a direct effect.

References

red-and-white crake
Birds of Argentina
Birds of the Atlantic Forest
Birds of Paraguay
Birds of Uruguay
red-and-white crake
Taxa named by Louis Jean Pierre Vieillot
Taxonomy articles created by Polbot